Cédric Schille (born 8 November 1975) is a French former footballer who played as a goalkeeper. He is remembered for helping amateur side Calais RUFC reach the Coupe de France Final 2000.

Schille retired from football in 2011.

Honours
Coupe de France runner-up: 2000

See also
Football in France
List of football clubs in France

References

1975 births
Living people
French footballers
Calais RUFC players
Footballers from Metz
Association football goalkeepers